Clive Allen Lawton  (born 14 July 1951) is a British Jewish educator, broadcaster and writer who was one of the founders, in 1980, of the educational charity Limmud. He is chief executive officer of the Commonwealth Jewish Council, a lecturer at the  London School of Jewish Studies, scholar-in-residence at JW3 and Senior Consultant to Limmud. He chaired the panel of judges for the 2020 Wingate Prize.

Early life and education

He was born in Stoke Newington, London on 14 July 1951 to Reginald Samuel Clifford and Regina (Attias) Lawton. He graduated from the University of York in 1973 with a B.A. in English and education and in 1974 with a postgraduate education certificate. Lawton has an M.A. in theatre studies from the Polytechnic of North London, an M.Ed. in  religious studies from the University of Liverpool and an M.Sc. in  educational management from the University of East London.

Personal and family life

Lawton was married from 1984 to 1992 to Sara Joy Leviten. He has two daughters: Anna and Evie. His daughter, Anna, was co-chair of the 2017 Limmud Festival.

He lives in London.

Honours

In the 2016 New Year Honours he was appointed OBE for his services to the Jewish community, "particularly through Limmud UK".

Publications
 Matza and Bitter Herbs, Hamish Hamilton, 1984, 
 Passport to Israel, Franklin Watts, 1987, 
The Jewish People: Some Questions Answered, Board of Deputies of British Jews, 1996, 
 The Story of The Holocaust, Franklin Watts, 1999, 
 My Belief: I Am A Jew, Franklin Watts, 2001, 
 Auschwitz: The Story of a Nazi Death Camp, Franklin Watts, 2002, 
 Hiroshima: The Story of the First Atom Bomb, Franklin Watts, 2004,

References

External links
 Profile at London School of Jewish Studies
 Commonwealth Jewish Council
 Growing Grown up Jews: A talk by Lawton at JW3, filmed in 2013

1951 births
Living people
20th-century British educators
20th-century British writers
21st-century British educators
21st-century British writers
Academics of the London School of Jewish Studies
English Jewish writers
English Orthodox Jews
Officers of the Order of the British Empire
People from Stoke Newington